Chaetostoma aburrensis is a species of catfish in the family Loricariidae. It is native to South America, where it is known only from Colombia.

References 

aburrensis
Fish described in 1909
Catfish of South America